Fireman Save My Child may refer to:

 Fireman Save My Child (1918 film), an American silent short comedy starring Harold Lloyd
 Fireman, Save My Child (1927 film), an American silent comedy featuring Wallace Beery and Raymond Hatton
 Fireman, Save My Child (1932 film), an American comedy starring Joe E. Brown
 Fireman Save My Child (1954 film), an American comedy starring Hugh O'Brian and Buddy Hackett